Adolph John I (German: Adolf Johann I., Swedish: Adolf Johan) (11 October 1629 – 14 October 1689) was Count Palatine of Kleeburg from 1654 until 1689 and was considered Prince of Sweden until 1660. He was the younger brother of King Charles X Gustav of Sweden.

Life
Adolph John was born in Stegeborg Castle, Sweden (now in Söderköping Municipality) in 1629 as the youngest son of John Casimir, Count Palatine of Kleeburg and Swedish Princess Catherine. He was Duke of Stegeborg after his elder brother Carl Gustav became the King of Sweden. At that time, he also obtained the County Palatine of Kleeburg.

Marriage
Adolph John married Countess Elizabeth Beatrice Brahe (31 August 1629 – 7 September 1653) on 19 June 1649 and had the following son:
 Gustavus Adolph (9 March 1652 – 1 August 1652)

Adolph John married Countess Elsa Elizabeth Brahe (29 January 1632 – 24 February 1689), daughter of Count Nicholas Brahe af Wisingsborg in 1661. They had the following children:
 Catherine (10 December 1661 – 27 May 1720), married to count Kristofer Gyllenstierna, no issue;
 Maria Elizabeth Louise (16 April 1663 – 23 January 1748), married to count Christian Gottlob von Gersdorff auf Oppach, no issue;
 Charles John (15 September 1664 – 10 December 1664);
 John Casimir (4 September 1665 – 29 May 1666);
 Adolph John (21 August 1666 – 27 April 1701), never married;
 Gustavus Casimir (29 June 1667 – 21 August 1669);
 Christina Magdalena (4 April 1669 – 21 June 1670);
 Gustavus Samuel Leopold (12 April 1670 – 17 September 1731), no issue;
 unnamed infant (12 December 1671).

Although he was the father of 10 children, Adolph John I had no grandchildren at all. If he had had progeny, they would have had a strong claim upon the throne of Sweden after the line of his brother, Charles X Gustav of Sweden, ended with Ulrika Eleonora. Since he had no progeny, the throne was claimed by the heirs of his eldest sister Christina Magdalena of the Palatinate-Zweibrücken.

Ancestry

References 

1629 births
1689 deaths
People from Söderköping Municipality
House of Wittelsbach
Adolph 1654
17th-century Swedish people
Disinherited European royalty
Counts Palatine of the Holy Roman Empire
Marshals of the Realm
Dukes of Stegeborg
People of the Swedish Empire
Royal reburials